The National Heritage Institute (INP) is a Tunisian public administrative institution responsible for dealing with Tunisian heritage. It has its headquarters in the Medina of Tunis. It has its origins in 1885 which is when the Department of Antiquities and Arts decided to start conducting real scientific studies of archaeological sites. It became the Directorate of Antiquities, and was replaced by the National Institute of Archaeology and Art (INAA) in 1957. In 1993 it received its current name. Its Director of Research is Leïla Ladjimi Sebaï.

References

Organisations based in Tunis
1880s establishments in Tunisia
1885 establishments in Africa
Tunisia